The , also known as Tower of Yasaka and Yasaka-no-to, is a Buddhist pagoda located in Kyoto, Japan. The 5-story tall pagoda is the last remaining structure of a 6th-century temple complex known as Hōkan-ji Temple. The pagoda is a popular tourist attraction.

History 

Archaeological evidence dates the foundation of the Yasaka Pagoda to the 7th Century. The founding date is disputed between the reign of Prince Shotoku and the sixth year of the Tenmu period (678 CE). The pagoda and the associated temple were destroyed and reconstructed several times up to 1408, of which the current pagoda stands to this day.

Control of the pagoda was historically disputed between the nearby Shinto Gion Shrine and the Buddhist temple of Kiyomizu-dera, to the point the pagoda was burnt down in May of 1179. It was later rebuilt in 1191 with funding from Kawachi Genji noble Minamoto no Yoritomo. In 1240, the head priest of the nearby Buddhist temple of Kennin-ji affiliated the pagoda with Zen Buddhism, which remains the official designation of the Yasaka Pagoda to the present day.

See also 
 Kennin-ji
 Kiyomizu-dera

References 

Buddhist temples in Kyoto
Buddhist temples in Kyoto Prefecture
Pagodas in Japan